Bronchial vessels may refer to:
 bronchial artery
 bronchial veins